The 2021–22 Northern Football League season was the 124th in the history of the Northern Football League, a football competition in England. The league operates two divisions in the English football league system, Division One at step 5, and Division Two at step 6.

The allocations for Steps 5 and 6 this season were announced by the Football Association (The FA) on 18 May 2021, and were subject to appeal.

After the abandonment of the 2019–20 and 2020–21 seasons due to the COVID-19 pandemic in England, numerous promotions were decided on a points per game basis over the previous two seasons.

Division One
At the end of the 2020–21 season, three teams left the division, all promoted to the Northern Premier League Division One East:
 Hebburn Town
 Shildon
 Stockton Town

The remaining seventeen teams, together with the following three promoted from Division Two, formed Division One for 2021–22:
 Crook Town
 Redcar Athletic
 West Allotment Celtic

Division One table

Inter-step play-off

Results table

Stadia and locations

Division Two
At the end of the 2020–21 season, three teams left the division, all promoted to Division One:
 Crook Town
 Redcar Athletic
 West Allotment Celtic

The remaining seventeen teams, together with the following four, formed Division Two for the 2021–22 season:
 Boldon Community Association – promoted from the Wearside League after appeal
 Blyth Town – promoted from the Northern Football Alliance
 Horden Community Welfare – promoted from the Wearside League
 Redcar Town – promoted from the North Riding League

Division Two table

Play-offs

Results table

Stadia and locations

References

External links
 Northern Football League

2021–22
9